Antoine Baroan (born 24 June 2000) is a French professional footballer who plays as a forward for Bulgarian club Botev Plovdiv.

Professional career
Baroan joined the youth academy of Chamois Niortais in 2009. Baroan made his professional debut with Niort in a 1–0 Ligue 2 win over AS Nancy on 24 August 2018.

On 25 June 2021, Baroan moved aboard and joined the Bulgarian Parva Liga team Botev Plovdiv.

International career
Baroan was born in France, the son of Ivorian former footballer Celestine Baroan. Baroan made one appearance for the France U17s in a 1–0 friendly win over the Czechia U17s on 23 September 2016.

References

External links
 
 
 
 

2000 births
Living people
Association football forwards
French footballers
France youth international footballers
French sportspeople of Ivorian descent
Chamois Niortais F.C. players
Botev Plovdiv players
Ligue 2 players
First Professional Football League (Bulgaria) players
French expatriate footballers
Expatriate footballers in Bulgaria